Outlook is a census-designated place and unincorporated community in Yakima County, Washington, United States. Outlook has a post office with ZIP code 98938.

Notable Citizens
Astronaut Bonnie Dunbar was born in Valley Memorial Hospital in Sunnyside, Washington but she grew up in Outlook. Dunbar wrote in her oral history that "the school I started out in, Outlook Elementary, went to eight grades. It was a very small rural school. I think there were probably twenty-two, twenty-three in my class all the way through eighth grade graduation."

Internet cartoonist Scott Meyer was born and raised in Outlook.

References

Unincorporated communities in Yakima County, Washington
Unincorporated communities in Washington (state)
Census-designated places in Washington (state)
Census-designated places in Yakima County, Washington